Bir Bhanu is the Marlan and Rosemary Bourns Endowed University of California Presidential Chair in Engineering, the Distinguished Professor of Electrical and Computer Engineering, and Cooperative Professor of Computer Science and Engineering, Mechanical Engineering and Bioengineering, at the Marlan and Rosemary Bourns College of Engineering at the University of California, Riverside (UCR). He is the first Founding Faculty of the Marlan and Rosemary Bourns College of Engineering at UCR and served as the Founding Chair of Electrical Engineering from 1/1991 to 6/1994 and the Founding Director of the Center for Research in Intelligent Systems (CRIS) from 4/1998 to 6/2019. He has been the director of Visualization and Intelligent Systems Laboratory (VISLab) at UCR since 1991. He was the Interim Chair of the Department of Bioengineering at UCR from 7/2014 to 6/2016. Additionally, he has been the Director of the NSF Integrative Graduate Education, Research and Training (IGERT) program in Video Bioinformatics at UC Riverside. Dr. Bhanu has been the principal investigator of various programs for NSF, DARPA, NASA, AFOSR, ONR, ARO and other agencies and industries in the areas of object/target recognition, learning and vision, image/video understanding, image/video databases with applications in security, defense, intelligence, biological and medical imaging and analysis, biometrics, autonomous navigation and industrial machine vision.

Education 
Dr. Bhanu received the S.M. and E.E. degrees in Electrical Engineering and Computer Science from the Massachusetts Institute of Technology; the Ph.D. degree in Electrical Engineering from the Image Processing Institute, University of Southern California and the M.B.A. degree from the University of California, Irvine. He also received B.S. (with Honors) in Electronics Engineering from the Indian Institute of Technology, BHU, Varanasi, and M.E. (with distinction) in Electronics Engineering from Birla Institute of Technology and Science, Pilani.

Work in Industry and Prior Affiliations 
Prior to joining UCR in 1991, Dr. Bhanu was Senior Fellow at Honeywell, Inc., Engineering Specialist at Ford Aerospace & Communications Corporation, Research Fellow at INRIA - France and Academic Associate at IBM San Jose Research Laboratory. His work in the industry dealt with computer vision, pattern recognition and machine learning with applications to target/object recognition, autonomous navigation with commercial, defense, space and intelligence applications. Dr. Bhanu has been on the faculty of the Department of Computer Science, University of Utah, where he worked on CAD-based vision and robotics, multi-sensor fusion, motion analysis, and computer vision and pattern recognition problems.

Recognition 
Dr. Bhanu is a Fellow of the Institute of Electrical and Electronics Engineers (IEEE), the American Association for the Advancement of Science (AAAS), the International Association for Pattern Recognition (IAPR), the International Society for Optical Engineering (SPIE), and the American Institute for Medical and Biological Engineering (AIMBE). Bhanu is also a member of ACM, AAAI, and BMES. Bhanu received the university, industry, and conference/journal paper awards for research excellence, outstanding contributions, team efforts, and best papers. He received an award from the President of Honeywell on patented technology on inertial navigation sensor integrated video-based navigation. He received the Dissertation Advisor/Mentoring Award of UC Riverside at the commencement held in June 2011. He received the Bourns College of Engineering Research Excellence Award in 2003 and Pioneering award in 2015. He received the UCR Faculty Research Lecturer Award, the UCR Senate's highest Award for Faculty Research in June 2019. It is the first such award for Bourns College of Engineering in 30 years. He received Distinguished Alumnus Award of BITS (Birla Institute of Technology and Science), Pilani in 2019. He has over 18 U.S. and International patents issued and several pending. He has over 550 refereed publications including over 155 journal papers. He was the General Chair for the first IEEE Workshop on Applications of Computer Vision, WACV (now renamed as IEEE Winter Conference on Applications of Computer Vision) (Palm Springs, CA, 1992, 2000, 2005 (Program Chair), 2015), Chair for the DARPA Image Understanding Workshop, IUW (Monterey, CA, 1994), General Chair for the IEEE Conference on Computer Vision and Pattern Recognition, CVPR (San Francisco, CA, 1996), General Chair for IEEE Advanced Video and Signal-based Surveillance, AVSS (Santa Fe, 2008), General Chair for ACM/IEEE International Conference on Distributed Smart Cameras ICDSC (Palm Springs in 2014), and General Chair for IEEE International Conference on Automatic Face and Gesture Recognition (Xian, China, 2018).

Authored Books 
Dr. Bhanu is the author of the following books:

 Human Recognition at a Distance in Video 
 Human Ear Recognition by Computer 
 Synthesis of Pattern Recognition Systems 
 Computational Algorithms for Fingerprint Recognition 
 Genetic Learning for Adaptive Image Segmentation 
 Qualitative Motion Understanding 
 Computational Learning for Adaptive Computer Vision 
 Video Bioinformatics: From Live Imaging to Knowledge (Edited) 
 Multibiometrics for Human Identification  (Edited) 
 Distributed Video Sensor Networks (Edited) 
 Computer Vision Beyond the Visible Spectrum (Edited) 
Deep Learning for Biometrics (Edited)

References 

1951 births
American electrical engineers
Living people
University of California, Riverside faculty
Fellows of the American Institute for Medical and Biological Engineering
Fellow Members of the IEEE
Fellows of the American Association for the Advancement of Science
Fellows of the International Association for Pattern Recognition
Fellows of SPIE
Engineers from California